Fadil Geci (born 19 March 1961) is a politician in Kosovo. A member of the Kosovo Liberation Army (KLA) during the 1998–99 Kosovo War, Geci served in the Assembly of Kosovo from 2001 to 2007, at first as a member of the Democratic League of Kosovo (Lidhja Demokratike e Kosovës, LDK) and later with the Democratic League of Dardania (Lidhja Demokratike e Dardanisë, LDD).

Early life and career
Geci was born in the village of Lausa (Albanian: Llaushê) in the municipality of Srbica (Albanian: Skenderaj), in what was then the Autonomous Region of Kosovo and Metohija in the People's Republic of Serbia, Federal People's Republic of Yugoslavia. He holds a law degree. He is the brother of Gani Geci.

Kosovo War
Geci was a member of the LDK presidency in the late 1990s. During the early period of the Kosovo War, he provided reports for the Albanian media on developments in Skenderaj. In a March 1998 report for a television station in Tirana, he said that there were food and medical shortages in the area and that Serbian snipers were "fir[ing] at anything that moves" in certain villages, including Llaushë. He also provided reports for the Kosovo Information Centre, one of the parallel institutions established by the Kosovo Albanian community in its boycott of state institutions in the 1990s. He relocated to Priština later in 1998; a news report indicates that he and several members of his family returned to Llaushê at around the end of October to reconstruct their home, which had been destroyed in prior bombardments. The Kosovo War ended in 1999, and the United Nations Interim Administration Mission in Kosovo (UNMIK) was established as a provisional authority.

In 2018, Geci said that he had founded a KLA group called Hasan Prishtina with Adem Jashari and Sali Çeku at the beginning of the conflict and was a leader of its activities in Drenica. The existence of Hasan Prishtina had previously been questioned by other political figures in Kosovo, who argued that it had been invented retroactively as a means of securing pension payments from the Government of Kosovo.

Politician
Geci's biographical entries on the Assembly of Kosovo website indicate that he served as deputy mayor of Skenderaj and as president of the municipality's directorate of health. It is not clear from online sources when he held these positions.

Local elections were held in Kosovo in 2000 under the auspices of UNMIK. Geci appeared in the second position on the LDK's electoral list in Skenderaj and was elected to the municipal assembly when the list won four seats. The rival Democratic Party of Kosovo (Partia Demokratike e Kosovës, PDK) won a majority, and the LDK served in opposition. Geci did not seek re-election in 2002.

Geci was reported to have risked a backlash from some members of his own community in February 2001, when he openly condemned a bomb attack that killed eleven members of Kosovo's Serb community. He was quoted as saying, "We had a meeting in the village and decided it was the worst, most cowardly thing what happened. We must find who did this. It would be easier to breathe freely and for the internationals to do their job if we do." He also said that he believed his life to be in danger from hardline elements the Albanian community, accusing Hashim Thaçi and his associates of being responsible for much of the ongoing violence in Kosovo. (Thaçi rejected this charge).

Parliamentarian
Geci was elected to the Assembly of Kosovo in the 2001 parliamentary election. The LDK won a convincing victory; Geci served as a supporter of the administration and was a member of the assembly's budget committee and emergency preparedness committee.

Geci took part in a seven-member delegation to the United States of America in October 2002 to research American political institutions. At a meeting with journalists in Salt Lake City, he indicated his support for the impending American invasion of Iraq.

In May 2003, Geci and PDK lawmaker Gani Koci fought each other in a hallway near the assembly chamber. The PDK blamed Geci for the confrontation and walked out of the assembly in protest.

Geci appeared in the fourteenth position on the LDK's list in the 2004 parliamentary election and was re-elected when the list won forty-seven mandates. The LDK remained the dominant force in Kosovo's coalition government after the election, and he continued to serve as an administration supporter. In this term, Geci was a member of the assembly's security committee.

In October 2006, it was reported that Geci had physically assaulted Skender Zogaj, president of the municipal assembly of Kosovo Polje.

The LDK became divided among different factions in the leadership battle that followed Ibrahim Rugova's death in 2006. In January 2007, Geci and five other members of the LDK's assembly group left the party to join the newly formed LDD. He was not a candidate in the 2007 parliamentary election but instead ran for mayor of Skenderaj in the concurrent local elections, finishing a distant second. He ran for mayor again in the 2009 local elections with the same result and has not returned to active political life since this time.

Electoral record

Local

Notes

References

1961 births
Living people
Kosovo Albanians
People from Skenderaj
Kosovo Liberation Army
Members of the Assembly of Kosovo (UNMIK mandate until 2008)
Democratic League of Kosovo politicians
Democratic League of Dardania politicians